Farmers by Nature is an album by a collective trio consisting of Gerald Cleaver on drums, William Parker on bass and Craig Taborn on piano. The three of them were specifically brought together by Cleaver. They had played previously on Rob Brown's album Crown Trunk Root Funk. The album was recorded live at The Stone in 2008 and released on the AUM Fidelity label.

Reception

In his review for AllMusic, Thom Jurek states "Farmers by Nature is not for the casual jazz fan. It gives up its secrets slowly, but the gems hidden in this sonic earth are plentiful, poetic, and remarkable."

The Down Beat review by Bill Meyer says that "The trio ranges freely between pulse-based lyricism, surging energy and gnomic exchanges, as though they were following an elliptical orbit that takes them far out, only to come close again.""

Track listing
All compositions by Cleaver/Parker/Taborn
 "Korteh Khah" – 3:18
 "The Night" – 8:42 
 "Cranes" – 16:40
 "Not Unlike Number 10" – 15:35
 "In Trees" – 6:57
 "Fieda Mytlie" – 13:55

Personnel
Gerald Cleaver - drums
William Parker – bass
Craig Taborn – piano

References

2009 live albums
Gerald Cleaver (musician) live albums
AUM Fidelity live albums